Manang is a town in the Manang District of Nepal. According to the preliminary result of the 2011 Nepal census it has a population of 6,527 people living in 1,495 individual households. Its population density is 3 persons/km2.

It is situated in the broad valley of the Marshyangdi River to the north of the Annapurna mountain range. The river flows to the east. To the west, the  Thorong La pass leads to Muktinath shrine and the valley of the Gandaki River. Most groups trekking around the Annapurna range will take resting days in Manang to acclimatize to the high elevation, before taking on Thorong La pass. The village is situated on the northern slope, which gets the most sunlight and the least snow cover in the winter. The cultivation fields are on the north slope with terraces.

There are now motorable road as well as trails where goods are transported on jeep or mule trains or carried by porters. The airport was begun in 1985. The development of a trail linking Manang to the Annapurna Conservation Area was finished in February 2011 and has brought many benefits to the villagers and the area.

Besides catering to trekkers, there is some agriculture and herding of yaks. There is a medical centre, which specializes in high-altitude sickness.

Gallery

See also 
Manang Language
Thonje
Milarepa Cave, Gandaki

References

External links

Populated places in Manang District, Nepal